Abhijit Chakraborty (born 13 March 1991) is an Indian cricketer. He made his Twenty20 debut for Tripura in the 2017–18 Zonal T20 League on 8 January 2018. He made his List A debut for Tripura in the 2017–18 Vijay Hazare Trophy on 5 February 2018.

References

External links
 

1991 births
Living people
Indian cricketers
Tripura cricketers
Place of birth missing (living people)